The Cataracs was an American hip hop record production project and duo formed in Berkeley, California, United States, consisting of songwriter, vocalist, and producer Niles "Cyranizzy" Hollowell-Dhar (born 6 October 1988) and formerly songwriter and vocalist David "Campa" Benjamin Singer-Vine (born 9 March 1988).

Albums

Studio albums

Extended plays

Singles

As lead artist

As featured artist

Guest appearances

Music videos

As lead artist

As featured artist

References 

Discographies of American artists